North West Tunisia (Arabic : الشمال الغربي التونسي ) is one of the six geographic and economic regions of Tunisia, consisting of four governorates: Béja, Kef, Siliana and Jendouba. The region had a population of 1,170,752 representing 12.2% of the total population of Tunisia. This makes it the 5th-most populous region in the country, with only South West Tunisia being smaller.

Geography 

The North West region is located in the extreme north of the country, bounded to the west by the Tunisian-Algerian border and to the east by Grand Tunis and the North East region. In the north, the region is bounded by the Mediterranean Sea (with a 51 km long coast) and Bizerte Governorate and to the south by the Central West Region.

The region is divided in half by the Medjerda River which is the longest river in the country. The North West is characterized by its unique forests and mountains (the Khroumire and Mogod Mountains), coral coasts and the large plains.

National parks
There are three national parks located wholly or partly in the North West: El Feidja National Park in Jendouba, Jebel Serj National Park shared between Siliana and Kairouan and the Jebel Chitana-Cap Négro National Park divided between Béja and Bizerte.

Demographics 

With 1,170,752 people, the North West is the 5th-most populous region in the country. In decreasing order of population, the North West consists of the following governorates:  

The region is characterized by its ruralness. In 2004 only 37,1% live in the cities (compared to 64,9% nationwide). This can be explained by the dominance of the agricultural sector in the region's economy. The region is also marked by its negative net migration of -45,300 between 1999 and 2004.

Cities and towns 
Despite its ruralness, there are several cities and towns in North West Tunisia:

Population over 100,000 
Jendouba
Béja
Population over 50,000
El Kef
Ghardimaou
Siliana
Population over 40,000
Tabarka 
Majaz al-Bab
Ain Draham
Bou Salem
Population over 20,000
Dahmani
Tajerouine
Sers
Téboursouk
Population over 10,000
Sakiet Sidi Youssef
Kalaat es Senam
Testour
Bou Arada 
Makthar

Social deprivation 
For a long time, the North West has been one of the poorest regions in Tunisia; it registers of the highest rates of poverty, unemployment and illiteracy in the country.

References

Geography of Tunisia